Euspondylus paxcorpus is a species of lizard in the family Gymnophthalmidae. It is endemic to Peru.

References

Euspondylus
Reptiles of Peru
Endemic fauna of Peru
Reptiles described in 2015
Taxa named by Tiffany M. Doan
Taxa named by Grant D. Adams